Illinois elected its member on August 2, 1824.

See also 
 1824 and 1825 United States House of Representatives elections
 List of United States representatives from Illinois

1824
Illinois
United States House of Representatives